Hostile Environment and Emergency First Aid Training, also known as HEFAT is a standard type of training in first aid, given to people entering hostile environments, mostly for work, and often to journalists.

History
The course was designed in 1993 by Centurion Safety of the UK. Paul Rees, a former Royal Marine, devised the course.

All BBC journalists entering hostile environments must do the HEFAT course. Other employers in difficult environments also make the course obligatory.

Structure
It is often a four to six-day residential course. The course is designed for the individual's safety and health, and not as training as a paramedic.

Syllabus
The course includes kidnap and mock executions. For hostile environments, the first aid on the course includes amputated limbs, something many first aid courses do not commonly cover.

Other topics include
 Ballistic trauma
 Carjacking
 Improvised explosive devices (IEDs)
 Land mines
 Personal protective equipment (PPE)
 Security checkpoints
 Sexual violence
 Vehicle security

See also
 List of emergency medicine courses
 Heat Transfer, Fluid Mechanics and Thermodynamics

References

External links
 Centurion Safety
 Hostile Environment Training Ltd
 www.hasptraining.co.uk

1993 establishments in the United Kingdom
Emergency medicine courses
Survival training